In plant taxonomy, commelinids (originally commelinoids) (plural, not capitalised) is a clade of flowering plants within the monocots, distinguished by having cell walls containing ferulic acid.

The commelinids are the only clade that the APG IV system has informally named within the monocots.  The remaining monocots are a paraphyletic unit. Also known as the commelinid monocots it forms one of three groupings within the monocots, and the final branch; the other two groups are the alismatid monocots and the lilioid monocots.

Description
Members of the commelinid clade have cell walls containing UV-fluorescent ferulic acid.

Taxonomy
The commelinids were first recognized as a formal group in 1967 by Armen Takhtajan, who named them the Commelinidae and assigned them to a subclass of Liliopsida (monocots).  The name was also used in the 1981 Cronquist system.  However, by the release of his 1980 system of classification, Takhtajan had merged this subclass into a larger one, and no longer considered it to be a clade.

Takhtajan system
The Takhtajan system treated this as one of six subclasses within the class Liliopsida (=monocotyledons). It consisted of the following:

subclass Commelinidae
superorder Bromelianae
order Bromeliales
order Velloziales
superorder Pontederianae
order Philydrales
order Pontederiales
order Haemodorales
superorder Zingiberanae
order Musales
order Lowiales
order Zingiberales
order Cannales
superorder Commelinanae
order Commelinales
order Mayacales
order Xyridales
order Rapateales
order Eriocaulales
superorder Hydatellanae
order Hydatellales
superorder Juncanae
order Juncales
order Cyperales
superorder Poanae
order Flagellariales
order Restionales
order Centrolepidales
order Poales

Cronquist system
The Cronquist system treated this as one of four subclasses within the class Liliopsida. It consisted of the following:

subclass Commelinidae
order Commelinales
order Eriocaulales
order Restionales
order Juncales
order Cyperales
order Hydatellales
order Typhales

APG system
The APG II system does not use formal botanical names above the rank of order; most of the members were assigned to the clade commelinids in the monocots (its predecessor, the APG system used the clade commelinoids).  The commelinids now constitute a well-supported clade within the monocots, and this clade has been recognized in all four APG classification systems.

Subdivision
The commelinids of APG II (2003) and APG III (2009) contain essentially the same plants as the commelinoids of the earlier APG system (1998). In APG IV (2016) the family Dasypogonaceae is no longer directly placed under commelinids but instead a family of order Arecales.

See also 
 List of commelinid families

References

Bibliography

External links

 
Plant unranked clades